Grandiflora may refer to:

 Grandiflora (rose), a rose cultivar group
 Grandiflora, a cultivar of Passiflora caerulea, the blue passion flower